The Order of Saint John in Sweden is a Protestant chivalric order. It is a member of the Alliance of the Orders of Saint John of Jerusalem.

It was founded in 1920 in Stockholm, Sweden, as an affiliate of the German Bailiwick of Brandenburg. In November 1946, it was granted a Royal Charter by King Gustav V as the Johanniterorden i Sverige. King Carl XVI Gustav is the current High Patron, and Queen Silvia is the First Honorary Member of the Order.

Medals, honors, and other ceremonial decorations from the Order are officially open to all citizens; however, they are currently only awarded to members of the House of Nobility, making it a de facto noble order.

Gallery
Ceremonial clothes for Knights of the Order, dating  early 1900s:

Notes

References

External links 
 Official website

Orders of chivalry of Sweden